Thomas Michel (born 9 February 1995) is a German professional basketball player who formerly played for Telekom Baskets Bonn of the German Basketball League.

References

External links
 Eurocup Profile
 German BBL Profile
 Eurobasket.com Profile

1995 births
Living people
Forwards (basketball)
German men's basketball players
Sportspeople from Bonn
Telekom Baskets Bonn players